The IPAG Business School (formerly Institut de préparation à l’administration et à la gestion) is a French private business school founded in 1965 by Jacques Rueff. It is located in Paris, Nice, Los Angeles and Kunming.

Research 
The IPAG Lab, created in 2009 by Frédéric Teulon, is the research center of the IPAG Business School and is among the best French laboratories in economics according to the RePEc ranking and the Shanghai ranking. To make itself known, this center clearly has a strategy for publishing articles: “We have a fixed rate for our teacher-researchers which is not spectacular and even below the market average. But our bonus system is very attractive when it comes to the publication of articles”. This strategy also pushes it up in the comparative rankings. Guillaume Bigot adds: “From the moment the rules were written by others and imposed on us, we started playing with them. The American journal Journal of Applied Business Research published 14 articles in 2013 signed or co-signed by permanent teacher-researchers at IPAG.

In 2014, an article by l'Etudiant examines IPAG's research policy and the controversy surrounding it in the field of management teachers and researchers.

Notable alumni 
 Inés Arrimadas, Spanish lawyer and politician
 Jack Bowles, French businessman

References

External links
 IPAG Business School

Business schools in France
Education in Paris
Education in Nice
Educational institutions established in 1965